Porcupine is a locality in the Shire of Finders, Queensland, Australia.

Geography 
The drainage divide created by the Great Dividing Range runs from north to south near the eastern boundary of the locality. As a consequence, the terrain in the locality is mountainous with peaks (from north to south) including Mount King , Mount Mistake , Mount Dick , Mount Cracknell , Mount Bradshaw , Mount James , Mount Emu , Mount Pleasant , Mount Oxley , Mount Sturgeon , Bald Hill , Mount Pleasant (again) , Mount Wongalee , and Mount Canterbury .

Numerous creeks rise in this area flowing into valleys west towards inland Queensland where they eventually become tributaries of the Flinders River which flows through the Gulf Country to the Gulf of Carpentaria. In contrast, the South Gregory River rises to the east of the divide and flows eventually into the Burdekin River which enters the Coral Sea at Upstart Bay, east of Ayr.

The Kennedy Developmental Road runs from north to south through the locality.

Some small areas of the locality are part of a number of national parks including Porcupine Gorge National Park (which protects the Porcupine Gorge created by Porcupine Creek, entirely within the southern part of the locality), White Mountains National Park (extending south-east into Torrens Creek) and Blackbraes National Park (extending north into Lyndhurst).

History 

The locality was named and bounded on 23 February 2001. The name is believed to derive from the appearance of the spiky leaves of the spinifex bushes in the area. In particular the Triodia scariosa is commonly known in Australia as ' porcupine grass '.

Education 
There are no schools in Porcupine, but neighbouring Hughenden has both primary and secondary schools.

References

External links 

Shire of Flinders (Queensland)
Localities in Queensland